The 2013–14 SIU Edwardsville Cougars men's basketball team represented Southern Illinois University Edwardsville during the 2013–14 NCAA Division I men's basketball season. The Cougars, led by seventh year head coach Lennox Forrester, played their home games at the Vadalabene Center and were members of the West Division of the Ohio Valley Conference. They finished the season 11–20, 7–9 in OVC play to finish in a tie for third place in the West Division. They lost in the first round of the Ohio Valley tournament to Tennessee Tech.

Preseason
Five players returned from the 9–18 team of 2012–13; two redshirt transfers, a transfer from a top NCAA Division II program (who had also played in Division I), and four junior college transfers are newly eligible.

During the summer of 2013, Kris Davis and Donivine Stewart, along with assistant coach Deryl Cunningham, were part of a goodwill tour sponsored by Global Sports Academy that spent eight days in Europe, playing games in Belgium, England, and the Netherlands.

After three eligible junior class lettermen did not return for the Fall semester, open tryouts were held on September 13 to fill out the roster with walk-on players. Juniors Akintoye Okunrinboye and Keaton Scheer were added to the team.

Season
During the early season, the Cougars were blown out by some strong teams such as St.Louis and Arkansas, and played close, but mostly lost to more evenly matched opponents. When OVC play began, they came together and became a tough match, gaining upset wins at home over eventual division champion Murray State and OVC tournament champ Eastern Kentucky to go with a couple of road wins. But, as the season wound down, they lost three of the last four while still qualifying for their first OVC tournament, which ended with a first round loss.

At the conclusion of the regular season, Cougars point guard Donivine Stewart was named to the Ohio Valley Conference All-Newcomer Team.

Roster
Source = 

Pink background indicates returning players from 2012–13

Schedule
Source = 

|-
!colspan=9 style="background:#CC0000; color:#000000;"| Exhibition

|-
!colspan=9 style="background:#CC0000; color:#000000;"| Regular season

|-
!colspan=9 style="background:#CC0000; color:#000000;"| 2014 Ohio Valley Conference tournament

References 

SIU Edwardsville
SIU Edwardsville Cougars men's basketball seasons
SIU Edwardsville Cougars men's basketball
SIU Edwardsville Cougars men's basketball